The National Museum of the Royal Navy, Portsmouth, formerly known as the Royal Naval Museum, is a museum of the history of the Royal Navy located in the Portsmouth Historic Dockyard section of HMNB Portsmouth, Portsmouth, Hampshire, England. The museum is part of the National Museum of the Royal Navy, a non-departmental public body sponsored by the Ministry of Defence. It received 1,081,909 visitors in 2017.

History
The museum was founded in 1911. Known originally as the "Dockyard Museum", it was conceived by Mr Mark Edwin Pescott-Frost, then secretary to the Admiral Superintendent at Portsmouth.  With a passion for naval history he spearheaded a project to save items for future generations, eventually leading to the opening of a new museum.  His foresight ensured the survival of many interesting and important artefacts, several of which are still on display today. He was awarded the Imperial Service Order in 1916.

In 1985, under the terms of the National Heritage Act 1983, the museum was devolved from the Ministry of Defence to become an executive non-departmental public body, supported by a grant-in-aid. At this juncture, the name was changed to become the "Royal Naval Museum, Portsmouth."

In 2008, the National Museum of the Royal Navy (NMRN) formally came into being with the express purpose of providing greater co-ordination of naval heritage in the broadest sense and, following on from this, in 2010, the Royal Naval Museum became a full subsidiary of the National Museum of the Royal Navy, and changed its name to "National Museum of the Royal Navy, Portsmouth"

Buildings and exhibits
The museum is housed in a row of three buildings which face . No. 11 Storehouse dates from 1763, and the adjacent No. 10 Storehouse from 1776; both are Grade I listed. The Victory Gallery is a purpose-built museum building of 1938. The museum ship  is in a dry dock alongside.

No. 11 Storehouse contains various exhibition spaces relating to the Age of Sail. The restored No. 10 Storehouse opened to the public in 2014 as the Babcock Galleries, housing a new permanent exhibition telling the story of the 20th- and 21st-century Navy, as well as temporary exhibition spaces. It also houses the Trafalgar Sail (the fore topsail of HMS Victory, said to be the largest surviving single original artefact from the Battle of Trafalgar). A new glass atrium links the two historic storehouses.

 Victory Gallery "tells the story of HMS Victory and the people who lived, worked and fought on board".
 Nelson Gallery tells the story of Horatio, Viscount Nelson.
 Sailing Navy Gallery tells of life at sea in the Sailing Navy.
 HMS Hear My Story tells "undiscovered stories from the ordinary men, women and ships which have made the Navy‘s amazing history over the last 100 years".

HMS M33, a World War I Monitor warship, is also part of the museum; she was opened to the public in 2015, her centenary year.

References

External links
National Museum of the Royal Navy, Portsmouth. Official website.

Maritime museums in England
Naval museums in England
Museums in Portsmouth
Ministry of Defence (United Kingdom)